Historic Charlton Park is a historically oriented local facility and museum in Barry County, Michigan, that sits on  along the Thornapple River.

The village is made up of a number of nineteenth and early-twentieth century structures that have been brought together from around the county to recreate a Michigan village from the turn of the 20th century.  Buildings include a lawyer's home, blacksmith shop, bank and insurance office, barber shop, inn and stagecoach stop, Church, carpenter/cooper shop, carriage house,
general store, hardware store, school, printshop, cabin, sawmill, and the Hastings Township Hall.   

Besides the historic village and museum, there is a swimming beach on the Thornapple River, along which the park is located.

External links
Charlton Park Historic Village and Museum - official site

Open-air museums in Michigan
Museums in Barry County, Michigan